Scrithacola is a monotypic genus of flowering plants belonging to the family Apiaceae. The only species is Scrithacola kurramensis.

Its native range is Afghanistan to Pakistan.

References

Apiaceae
Monotypic Apiaceae genera